Hemidactylus kimbulae is a species of gecko. It is endemic to Sri Lanka.

References

Hemidactylus
Reptiles described in 2021
Endemic fauna of Sri Lanka
Reptiles of Sri Lanka